Events from the year 1791 in France.

Incumbents 
Monarch: Louis XVI
The Legislative Assembly (after 1 October)

Events

January
 On 28 January Robespierre discussed the organisation of the National Guard in the Assembly; for three years a hot topic in French newspapers.

February
28 February – Day of Daggers; a confrontation between the guards and nobles.

March
2 March
Claude Chappe and his brothers first demonstrated the optical telegraph.
Early March provincial militias were abolished and the Département de Paris was placed above the Paris Commune (1789-1795) in all matters of general order and security. 
March – The National Constituent Assembly accepts the recommendation of its Commission of Weights and Measures that the nation should adopt the metric system.

May
 On 9 May, the Assembly discussed the right to petition.
 On Sunday 15 May the Constituent Assembly declared full and equal citizenship for all free people of color. 
 On 16–18 May when the elections began, Robespierre proposed and carried the motion that no deputy who sat in the Constituent assembly could sit in the succeeding Legislative assembly.
 On 28 May, Robespierre proposed all Frenchmen should be declared active citizens and eligible to vote. 
 On 30 May, Robespierre delivered a speech on the abolishment of the death penalty but without success.

June
14 June – The abolition of the guild system was sealed; the Le Chapelier Law 1791 passed, which prohibited any kind of workers' coalition or assembly. 
20–21 June – During the Flight to Varennes, Louis XVI and his family attempt to escape Paris, but are instead arrested at Varennes.

July

11 July – The ashes of Voltaire are transferred to the Panthéon. An estimated million people attended the procession. 
 Between 13 and 15 July the Assembly debated the restoration of the king and his constitutional rights.
Saturday 17 July – The Champ de Mars massacre occurs in Paris. Jean Sylvain Bailly and Marquis de LaFayette declared a ban on gathering followed by martial law.
19 July, the King was restored in his functions.

August
21 August – Haitian Revolution: A slave rebellion breaks out in the French colony of Saint-Domingue.
27 August
Declaration of Pillnitz: A proclamation by Frederick William II of Prussia and the Habsburg Leopold II, Holy Roman Emperor, affirms their wish to "put the King of France in a state to strengthen the bases of monarchic government." 
Third Anglo-Mysore War: Battle of Tellicherry: Off the south-west coast of India: a British Royal Navy patrol forces a French convoy bound for Mysore to surrender.

29 August-5 September – 1791 French legislative election.

September
3 September – The French Constitution of 1791 is accepted.
4 September – Louis XVI receives the title of King of the French.
13 September – Louis XVI accepts the final version of the completed constitution.
14 September – The Papal States lose Avignon to France.
28 September – Law on Jewish emancipation is promulgated, the first such legislation in modern Europe.
 On 29 September, the day before the dissolution of the Assembly, Robespierre opposed Jean Le Chapelier, who wanted to proclaim an end to the revolution and restrict the freedom of the clubs.

October
1 October – The Legislative Assembly convenes. 
6 October – The French Penal Code of 1791 is adopted. 
On 14 October a law passed to reorganize the Garde Nationale in cantons and districts; officers and sub-officers were to be elected for only one year.
16–17 October – Massacres of La Glacière.
28 October – The Declaration of the Rights of Woman and of the Female Citizen is published.

November
On 16 November 1791 Pétion de Villeneuve was elected mayor of Paris in a contest against Lafayette.

Births
28 January – Ferdinand Hérold, composer
26 May – Jean Vatout
30 June – Félix Savart, physicist
19 July – Odilon Barrot
26 September – Théodore Géricault, painter
17 November – Louis-Étienne de Thouvenin
24 December – Eugène Scribe

Deaths

2 April – Honoré Gabriel Riqueti, comte de Mirabeau, revolutionary leader
10 June – Toussaint-Guillaume Picquet de la Motte, admiral
9 July – Jacques-Nicolas Tardieu, engraver
26 November – Nicolas Bricaire de la Dixmerie, man of letters
12 December – Etteilla, occult cartomancer
13 December – Mathieu Tillet, botanist

References

Sources

 
 

1790s in France